The 2014–15 Utah Valley Wolverines men's basketball team represented Utah Valley University in the 2014–15 NCAA Division I men's basketball season. Dick Hunsaker was in his thirteenth season as the UVU head coach. The Wolverines played their home games at the UCCU Center as members of the Western Athletic Conference. They finished the season 11–19, 5–9 in WAC play to finish in sixth place. They lost in the quarterfinals of the WAC tournament to Cal State Bakersfield.

On March 8, head coach Dick Hunsaker announced he would be stepping down at the end of the season.

Previous season 
The Wolverines finished the season 20–12, 13–3 in WAC play to win the WAC regular season championship. They advanced to the semifinals of the WAC tournament where they lost to Idaho. As a regular season conference champion who failed to win their conference tournament, they received an automatic bid to the National Invitation Tournament where they lost in the first round to California.

Roster

Radio broadcasts and streams
All Wolverines games will air on KOVO, part of The Zone family of networks. Games will be streamed online through The Zone's webpage as well as at Utah Valley's Stretch Internet feed.

Schedule and results

|-
!colspan=9 style="background:#006633; color:#CFB53B;"| Exhibition

|-
!colspan=9 style="background:#006633; color:#CFB53B;"| Regular season

|-
!colspan=9 style="background:#006633; color:#CFB53B;"| WAC tournament

References

Utah Valley Wolverines men's basketball seasons
Utah Valley